In operator theory, an area of mathematics, Douglas' lemma relates factorization, range inclusion, and majorization  of Hilbert space operators. It is generally attributed to Ronald G. Douglas, although Douglas acknowledges that aspects of the result may already have been known. The statement of the result is as follows:

 
  for some 
 There exists a bounded operator  on  such that .
Moreover, if these equivalent conditions hold, then there is a unique operator  such that
 
 
 .

A generalization of Douglas' lemma for unbounded operators on a Banach space was proved by Forough (2014).

See also
 Positive operator

References

Operator theory